Ethinamate (Valamin, Valmid) is a short-acting carbamate-derivative sedative-hypnotic medication used to treat insomnia.  Regular use leads to drug tolerance, and it is usually not effective for more than 7 days.  Prolonged use can lead to dependency.

Ethinamate has been replaced by other medicines (particularly benzodiazepines), and it is not available in the Netherlands, the United States or Canada.

It is a schedule IV substance in the United States.

Synthesis
Ethinamate (1-ethynylcyclohexanone carbamate) is synthesized by combining acetylene with cyclohexanone to make 1-ethynylcyclohexanol, and then transforming this into a carbamate by the subsequent reaction with phosgene, and later with ammonia. Some lithium metal or similar is used to make the acetylene react with the cyclohexanone in the first step.

References 

Hypnotics
Sedatives
Carbamates
Ethynyl compounds
GABAA receptor positive allosteric modulators